The Edgar Johnson House is a house located in Jerome, Idaho, United States, listed on the National Register of Historic Places. It is locally significant as an example of rural vernacular bungalow design, as well as lava rock craftsmanship. With its double gable facade, this house represents the standard patternbook bungalow style.

See also

 List of National Historic Landmarks in Idaho
 National Register of Historic Places listings in Jerome County, Idaho

References

1910 establishments in Idaho
Bungalow architecture in Idaho
Houses completed in 1910
Houses in Jerome County, Idaho
Houses on the National Register of Historic Places in Idaho
National Register of Historic Places in Jerome County, Idaho